Üçbulaq (official name until 1999). is a village and municipality in the Goygol District of Azerbaijan. The village had an Armenian population before the exodus of Armenians from Azerbaijan after the outbreak of the Nagorno-Karabakh conflict.

Demographics
It has a population of 192.

References

Populated places in Goygol District